Mindaugas Kalonas (born 28 February 1984) is a Lithuanian former professional footballer who played as a midfielder.

Club career
Kalonas played in the youth teams of Dynamo Moscow, then moved to Rubin Kazan, before having a spell at Portuguese club S.C. Braga. But at neither club he made it through to the first team. He then moved to Latvia where he played with FHK Liepājas Metalurgs, who went on to win the 2006 Virslīga. In the following season, Kalonaswon the Latvian Cup with his team and placed second in the league.

After a spell with Kuban Krasnodar, he signed for FK Riga in January 2008. In July 2008, his club played against Bohemian F.C. in the UEFA Intertoto Cup, where Kalonas impressed Bohs manager Pat Fenlon. On 31 July 2008, he signed a contract with Bohemian F.C. until the end of the season and made his debut for the Gypsies in 3–0 win over Cobh Ramblers at Dalymount Park on 1 August. Kalonas adapted well to the League of Ireland and netted his first goal for Bohs in a 2–0 win over Galway United on 22 August. He quickly became a fan favourite, netting the winner in a game against rivals Shamrock Rovers and the deciding penalty in a shoot-out to claim The Double in the FAI Cup Final against Derry City. He also became the first Lithuanian to play in an FAI Cup Final.

In 2009, he signed a three-year contract with Metalurh Zaporizhya. In his two and a half years at the club, Kalonas played 31 games and scored one goal, which came against Metalurh Donetsk. On 23 July 2012, Kalonas joined Polish I liga side Stomil Olsztyn.

In January 2013, Kalonas joined Azerbaijan Premier League side Ravan Baku, scoring eight goals in 13 league games. At the end of the 2012–13 season Kalonas moved to FC Baku. In November 2013, Kalonas was named Lithuanian Footballer of the Year 2013. On 4 February 2014, Kalonas joined Simurq PIK on loan for the remainder of the 2013–14 season.

On 10 June 2014, Kalonas joined Hapoel Haifa on a two-year contract. After only six-months in Israel, Kalonas returned to Latvia, signing a one-year contract with Virslīga side Skonto FC. Kalonas was released by Skonto FC in June 2015, just two months after arriving at the club.

In August 2015, Kalonas signed for his former club Ravan Baku. However, his contract was cancelled on 20 August 2015, only a few days after his arrival and without having played a match for the club, after manager Emin Quliyev was dissatisfied with his training. In September 2015 he signed to Hapoel Nazareth Illit.

In February 2016, Kalonas signed with Kauno Žalgiris. On 12 March 2016, he debuted for the club in a 0−2 defeat against FK Trakai, which also marked his first ever appearance in the highest league of his home country, the A Lyga. In May 2016, Kauno Žalgiris announced that the contract with Kalonas has been terminated. In August 2016, Kalonas joined Umaglesi Liga side Sioni Bolnisi.

On 1 March 2017, Kalonas joined Estonian Meistriliiga participants Sillamäe Kalev. After two months at the club, his contract was terminated, with head coach Vadym Dobizha citing Kalonas' lacking fitness and discipline as the reasons for his departure.

International career
Kalonas made his debut for the Lithuania national team on 1 March 2006 in a friendly match against Albania. Until 2010, he made 35 appearances for the national team, before being re-called again in 2013. In total, he earned 49 caps for Lithuania, scoring three goals.

Career statistics

Club

International

Scores and results list Lithuania's goal tally first, score column indicates score after each Kalonas goal.

Honours
Liepājas Metalurgs
 Virsliga: 2005; runner-up 2004, 2006, 2007
 Latvian Cup: 2006; runner-up 2005
 Baltic League: 2007

Bohemians
 League of Ireland: 2008
 FAI Cup: 2008

References

External links

1984 births
Living people
Lithuanian footballers
Lithuania international footballers
Association football midfielders
Lithuanian expatriate footballers
FK Žalgiris players
FK Kauno Žalgiris players
FC Dynamo Moscow reserves players
FC Rubin Kazan players
S.C. Braga players
FK Liepājas Metalurgs players
FC Kuban Krasnodar players
FK Rīga players
Bohemian F.C. players
FC Metalurh Zaporizhzhia players
OKS Stomil Olsztyn players
Ravan Baku FC players
FC Baku players
Simurq PIK players
Hapoel Haifa F.C. players
Skonto FC players
Hapoel Nof HaGalil F.C. players
FC Sioni Bolnisi players
JK Sillamäe Kalev players
A Lyga players
Latvian Higher League players
Russian Premier League players
League of Ireland players
Ukrainian Premier League players
I liga players
Azerbaijan Premier League players
Israeli Premier League players
Liga Leumit players
Erovnuli Liga players
Meistriliiga players
Expatriate footballers in Russia
Lithuanian expatriate sportspeople in Russia
Expatriate footballers in Portugal
Lithuanian expatriate sportspeople in Portugal
Expatriate footballers in Latvia
Lithuanian expatriate sportspeople in Latvia
Expatriate association footballers in the Republic of Ireland
Lithuanian expatriate sportspeople in Ireland
Expatriate footballers in Ukraine
Lithuanian expatriate sportspeople in Ukraine
Expatriate footballers in Poland
Lithuanian expatriate sportspeople in Poland
Expatriate footballers in Azerbaijan
Lithuanian expatriate sportspeople in Azerbaijan
Expatriate footballers in Israel
Lithuanian expatriate sportspeople in Israel
Expatriate footballers in Georgia (country)
Lithuanian expatriate sportspeople in Georgia (country)
Expatriate footballers in Estonia
Lithuanian expatriate sportspeople in Estonia